The 1950 U.S. National Championships (now known as the US Open) was a tennis tournament that took place on the outdoor grass courts at the West Side Tennis Club, Forest Hills in New York City, United States. The tournament ran from 25 August until 5 September. It was the 70th staging of the U.S. National Championships, and the fourth Grand Slam tennis event of the year. A highlight of that year's tournament was Margaret Osborne du Pont's triple crown.

Finals

Men's singles

 Art Larsen defeated   Herb Flam 6–3, 4–6, 5–7, 6–4, 6–3

Women's singles

 Margaret Osborne duPont defeated  Doris Hart 6–3, 6–3

Men's doubles
 John Bromwich /  Frank Sedgman defeated  Bill Talbert /  Gardnar Mulloy 7–5, 8–6, 3–6, 6–1

Women's doubles
 Louise Brough /  Margaret Osborne duPont defeated  Shirley Fry /  Doris Hart 6–2, 6–3

Mixed doubles
 Margaret Osborne duPont /   Ken McGregor defeated  Doris Hart /  Frank Sedgman 6–4, 3–6, 6–3

References

External links
Official US Open website

 
U.S. National Championships
U.S. National Championships (tennis) by year
U.S. National Championships
U.S. National Championships
U.S. National Championships
U.S. National Championships